The 2012 Guangzhou International Women's open doubles was a women's tennis tournament played on outdoor hard courts in Guangzhou, China.

Hsieh Su-wei and Zheng Saisai were the defending champions, but decided not to participate together. Hsieh played alongside Hsieh Shu-ying, but lost in the quarterfinals to Tamarine Tanasugarn and Zhang Shuai.  Zheng competed with Tetiana Luzhanska, but lost in the semifinals to Jarmila Gajdošová and Monica Niculescu.
Tamarine Tanasugarn and Zhang Shuai defeated in the final the first seeded Jarmila Gajdošová and Monica Niculescu with the score 2–6, 6–2, [10–8].

Seeds

Draw

References
Main Draw

Guangzhou International Women's Open - Doubles
2012 Doubles